{{speciesbox
| status = LC
| status_system = IUCN3.1
| status_ref =  
| genus = Uracentron
| species = azureum
| authority = (Linnaeus, 1758)
| synonyms = 
Lacerta azurea Linnaeus, 1758
Stellio brevicaudatus Latreille, 1802Stellio azureus – Latreille, 1802
Uromastyx azurea – Merrem, 1820Uracentron azureum – Kaup, 1826
Doryphorus [sp. ?] – Cuvier, 1829Urocentron azurea – Wagler, 1830
Uranocentron [sp. ?] – Gray, 1831Doryphorus azureus – Duméril & Bibron, 1837
Uranocentrum [sp. ?] – O'Shaugnessy, 1881
Uracentron azureum – Boulenger, 1885Hoplurus azureus – Schlegel, 1858
Tropidurus azureum – Frost 1992Uracentron azureum guentheri Boulenger 1894
Uracentron guentheri Boulenger, 1894Uracentron azureum werneri Mertens, 1925
Uracentron werneri Mertens, 1925
}}

The green thornytail iguana (Uracentron azureum) is an arboreal species of lizard from the Amazon rainforest and forests in the Guiana Shield. It is found in Colombia, Guyana, Suriname, French Guiana, northeastern Peru, southern Venezuela, and northern Brazil.Avila-Pires (1995). Lizards of Brazilian Amazonia (Reptilia: Squamata). Zoologische Verhandelingen 299(1): 1-706 In addition to the nominate subspecies from the northeastern part of its range, it has two subspecies: the southwestern T. a. guentheri and the northwestern T. a. werneri. As in U. flaviceps (the only other species in the genus), U. azureum'' primarily feeds on ants.

References 

Reptiles of Brazil
Reptiles of Colombia
Reptiles of French Guiana
Reptiles of Guyana
Reptiles of Peru
Reptiles of Suriname
Reptiles of Venezuela
Uracentron
Reptiles described in 1758
Taxa named by Carl Linnaeus